Nick DeFelice (born February 4, 1940) is a former American football tackle. He played for the New York Jets in 1965.

References

1940 births
Living people
American football tackles
Southern Connecticut State Owls football players
New York Jets players